The Macedonian Orthodox Diocese of America and Canada is one of 10 dioceses of the Macedonian Orthodox Church. Operating a near total of forty churches in Canada and the United States, the diocese is headed by Metropolitan Methodius.

History

The Macedonian Orthodox Church (MOC) created its first diocese in 1967 for Macedonian diaspora communities that covered Canada, the United States, Australia and New Zealand. By 1981, the MOC split the diocese into two parts creating a diocese for Australia and New Zealand and another diocese for Canada and the United States. 

Metropolitan Methodius was placed to oversee the diocese in 2006. It was restructured after he went to the United States were the diocese was split as 3 regencies, the Midwest regency and East regency for the United States, and a Canadian regency. The Midwest regency has its seat in Crown Point, Indiana, led by Tome Stamatov, Father Branko Postolovski is in charge of the East regency, based in Syracuse, New York, and Father Trajko Boseovski oversees the Canadian regency located in Toronto, Canada.

References

External links
Official website of the Macedonian Orthodox Church

Macedonian Orthodox dioceses
Eastern Orthodox dioceses in Canada
Eastern Orthodox dioceses in the United States
Macedonian Orthodox churches in the United States
Macedonian-Canadian culture